Salah Asfar Shishtawai J. Dessouki (22 October 1922 – 17 August 2011) was an Egyptian fencer. He won bronze medals in three fencing disciplines across four editions of the World Championships and competed at the 1948 and 1952 Summer Olympics. By career he was a government official and served in several capacities, including as Governor of Cairo.

Biography
Dessouki was born in Cairo on 22 October 1922. After World War II, he won three consecutive bronze medals in the team sabre event at the World Fencing Championships in 1947, 1949, and 1950. In all three years his team consisted of Mohamed Abdel Rahman, Mahmoud Younes, and Mohamed Zulficar. In 1949 and 1950 the squad also included Ahmed Abou-Shadi, while in 1950 they were aided by Roland Steinauer. In 1949, Dessouki, Abdel Rahman, Younes, and a fencer with the surname Schmeil also took bronze in the team épée, while Dessouki, Younes, Zulficar, Osman Abdel Hafeez, Hassan Hosni Tawfik, and Anwar Tawfik came in third in the team foil. The squad repeated this feat in 1950, with Steinauer replacing Anwar Tawfik, and in 1951 with Abou-Shadi instead of Seinauer. 

Dessouki also competed at two editions of the Olympic Games, taking part in all three team discipline events each time. His best placement at each edition was in the team foil competition, finishing fifth in 1948 and fourth in 1952, losing to Hungary in the bronze medal match of the latter. In 1948 he also took part in the individual sabre tournament, but was eliminated in the semi-finals. In 1952 he competed individually in the foil category, finishing seventh. At the inaugural Mediterranean Games in 1951, held in Alexandria, Egypt, he took home three medals: silver in the team sabre and bronze in the team foil and épée.

In addition to fencing, he also played tennis and served as president of the Veterans Tennis Federation of Egypt, as well as of Al Ahly SC from 1961 through 1965. Outside of sport, Dessouki had a career in politics. He served as Governor of Cairo, an Egyptian ambassador, and as regional director of the United Nations Environment Programme and the Canadian International Development Research Centre for the Middle East and North Africa. He was also a member of the International Institute for Strategic Studies and chairman of Sinai Hotels. He died in August 2011 in Nasr City.

References

External links
 

1922 births
2011 deaths
Egyptian male épée fencers
Egyptian male foil fencers
Egyptian male sabre fencers
Olympic fencers of Egypt
Fencers at the 1948 Summer Olympics
Fencers at the 1952 Summer Olympics
Mediterranean Games silver medalists for Egypt
Mediterranean Games bronze medalists for Egypt
Fencers at the 1951 Mediterranean Games
Mediterranean Games medalists in fencing
Governors of Cairo